I Live as I Please is a 1942 Italian "white-telephones" comedy film directed by Mario Mattoli and starring Ferruccio Tagliavini, Silvana Jachino and Luigi Almirante. It was shot at the Titanus Studios in Rome. The film's sets were designed by the art directors Piero Filippone and Mario Rappini.

Cast
 Ferruccio Tagliavini as Stefano
 Silvana Jachino as Maria
 Luigi Almirante as L'impresario 
 Carlo Campanini as Oreste 
 Nino Crisman as Leone 
 Carlo Micheluzzi as Il commesso viaggiatore 
 Giovanni Grasso as Il dottore 
 Armando Migliari as Il padre di Stefano 
 Dora Bini as Claretta 
 Loris Gizzi as Il tenore 
 Piero Carnabuci as Il direttore d'orchestra

References

Bibliography
 Roberto Chiti & Roberto Poppi. I film: Tutti i film italiani dal 1930 al 1944. Gremese Editore, 2005.

External links

1942 films
1942 comedy films
1940s Italian-language films
Italian black-and-white films
Italian comedy films
Films directed by Mario Mattoli
1940s Italian films